Richard McKinney (born 18 May 1979 Ballymoney, Northern Ireland), is a goalkeeper who plays for Great Wakering Rovers in the Isthmian League First Division North.

He has formerly played for Ballymena United, Manchester City, Swindon Town, Colchester United, Walsall, Canvey Island, Chelmsford City and Heybridge Swifts, and represented Northern Ireland at Under-18 and Under-21 levels.

References

1979 births
Living people
Association footballers from Northern Ireland
Canvey Island F.C. players
Walsall F.C. players
Colchester United F.C. players
Manchester City F.C. players
Swindon Town F.C. players
Chelmsford City F.C. players
Wivenhoe Town F.C. players
Great Wakering Rovers F.C. players
People from Ballymoney
Association football goalkeepers